The Loa River (Spanish: Río Loa) is a U-shaped river in Chile's northern Antofagasta Region.

Course
The Loa's sources are located on Andean mountain slopes at the foot of Miño Volcano. The upper Loa basin is flanked on the west by a ridge with elevations that reach above , whereas to the east lies a volcanic chain, which separates it from endorheic basins as that of Salar de Ascotán.

The upper courses of the river are at a considerable elevation above sea level and receive a large volume of water from the Andes, mainly of two major tributaries: San Pedro de Inacaliri River and Salado River. The water of its upper course and tributaries is fresh. However the lower course, as in all the rivers of this region becomes brackish.

From Chiu Chiu, the Loa flows west and north in a great curve to Quillagua (kee-YAH-gwah).

From Quillagua, its dry channel turns westward again and marks the border between the regions of Tarapacá and Antofagasta. Along its lower course, the Loa flows through a  canyon, which crosses the Chilean Coastal Range. The river reaches the Pacific Ocean in lat. 21° 26' S., a few miles south of the old port of Huanillos (Wan-EE-yōs).

The hydrologic regime of the river basin is rain-dominated. The increase of its water volume occurs mainly in January and February, as a consequence of the phenomenon known locally as Bolivian Winter.

History
Its banks have been inhabited from early times. Evidence of this is the notable number of geoglyphs, petroglyphs and pictographs that are found along its course and in its upper basin.

Another indication of its rich past is the Pukará de Lasana.

Bridges
To the south of Conchi reservoir, the river is spanned by the Conchi Viaduct, an old railroad bridge.

Needs
This river supplies many towns with water used to raise shrimp. Lately, mining companies have been polluting this river, making the water unusable.

References

This article draws partially on the corresponding article in the Spanish-language Wikipedia, accessed July 10, 2007.

External links
 EVALUACION DE LOS RECURSOS HIDRICOS SUPERFICIALES EN LA CUENCA DEL RIO LOA

Rivers of Antofagasta Region
Rivers of Tarapacá Region
Rivers of Chile